Patrick Bowes-Lyon and Herbert Wilberforce defeated E. Barratt-Smith and James Crispe 7–5, 6–3, 6–2 in the all comers' final to win the gentlemen's doubles tennis title at the 1887 Wimbledon Championships. The reigning champions Ernest Renshaw and William Renshaw were unable to defend their title due to William suffering from tennis elbow.

Draw

All Comers'

References

External links

Gentlemen's Doubles
Wimbledon Championship by year – Men's doubles